Barns Green is a village in the Horsham district of West Sussex, England. It is noted for the annual half marathon race of the same name, held around the end of September.

Barns Green is a rural community, with a village shop and post office, pub, primary school, sports club, campsite, cafe, fishery, village hall, riding school and village green. It has a number of locally based community clubs including toddler group, youth club, brownies, amateur dramatics, book club, and several sports clubs.

The Downs Link Bridleway passes through the village from Southwater in one direction, and Slinfold in the other.

References

External links 

Villages in West Sussex